The Fields Medal Symposium is an annual event that honours one of the Fields Medal recipients from the most recent International Congress of Mathematicians. The symposium is jointly endorsed by the International Mathematical Union and the Fields Institute for Mathematical Sciences. The idea was conceived in preparation for the International Congress of Mathematicians 2010 (ICM2010) in Hyberdad, India. Professor Edward Bierstone of the University of Toronto was the director of the institute during the inaugural symposium in October 2012. All symposiums take place at the Fields Institute in Toronto, Canada. The symposia include mathematical activity that explore work related to the honoured Fields Medallist. They will include public lectures meant to spark interest in mathematics including public lectures and events for students.

List of Symposium Honorees

References

 http://www.fields.utoronto.ca/about
 http://www.fields.utoronto.ca/press/10-11/080911Symposium.html

Mathematics conferences